Lynn Scott (born June 23, 1977) is a former American football safety in the National Football League for the Dallas Cowboys. He played college football at Northwestern Oklahoma State University.

Early years
Scott attended Turpin High School, where he helped his team win the 1995 Class 1A state title. He accepted a football scholarship from Northwestern Oklahoma State University, where he was a three-time NAIA All-American and helped his team win the 1999 NAIA national championship. As a freshman, he was named a starter at safety, recording 90 tackles, 2 interceptions, while returning 17 punts for 208 yards (12.2-yard average).

As a sophomore, he registered 49 tackles, 2 interceptions, 4 passes defensed, while returning 12 puns for 337 yards (28.1-yard average) and 2 touchdowns.
As a junior, he collected 87 tackles, 5 interceptions, 5 passes defensed, while returning 16 punts for 197 yards (12.3-yard average) and one touchdown.

As a senior, he posted 72 tackles, 4 interceptions, 9 passes defensed, while returning 26 punts for a school record 595 yards (22.9-yard average) and 4 touchdowns. He finished his college career with 298 tackles and the school record for most punt return yards in a season (595) and in a career (1,337).

In 2009, he was named NAIA Defensive Player of the Decade. In 2012, he was inducted into the Northwestern Sports Hall of Fame.

Professional career
Scott was signed as an undrafted free agent by the Dallas Cowboys after the 2001 NFL Draft. He finished 15 special teams tackles (third on the team), 5 defensive tackles and 2 fumble recoveries.

In 2002, he tallied 15 tackles, 2 passes defensed, one quarterback pressure and 8 special teams tackles. In 2003, he had 3 tackles, 1 pass defensed and 8 special teams tackles.

In 2004, he started 9 games at strong safety alongside Roy Williams, after Darren Woodson was lost for the season with a herniated disk in his lower back. He finished with 46 tackles, one sack, one interception, 3 passes defensed, one fumble recovered and 11 special teams tackles. 

He was waived on September 3, 2005, but was later re-signed on November 1st. He appeared in 6 games, making 3 special teams tackles. He wasn't re-signed at the end of the season.

References

1977 births
Living people
People from Beaver County, Oklahoma
Players of American football from Oklahoma
American football safeties
Northwestern Oklahoma State Rangers football players
Dallas Cowboys players